Clean sweep may refer to:

 Clean sweep (naval), a naval expression meaning a successful mission
 Clean Sweep (film), a 1918 silent film comedy short
 Operation Clean Sweep, a 2004 coalition counter-insurgency operation in Iraq
 A Clean Sweep, a 1958 British comedy film
 Clean-Sweep, a fictional character in the G.I. Joe universe
 Clean Sweep, a Hardy Boys novel
 Quarterdeck CleanSweep, a software utility for Microsoft Windows used to uninstall applications
 Podium sweep or clean sweep, when one team wins all available medals in a single sporting event